Kevin Eagan is a retired American soccer defender who played in the North American Soccer League.

Eagan attended the University of South Florida, playing on the men's soccer team from 1973 to 1977.  In January 1977, the Tampa Bay Rowdies selected Eagan as the 17th overall pick of the North American Soccer League draft.  The Rowdies released him at the end of 1978 and he signed as a free agent with the New York Cosmos in 1979.  He moved to the Tulsa Roughnecks in 1980 and played both indoor and outdoor seasons with them.

References

External links
 NASL career stats

Living people
People from Florissant, Missouri
Soccer players from Missouri
American soccer players
North American Soccer League (1968–1984) indoor players
New York Cosmos players
North American Soccer League (1968–1984) players
South Florida Bulls men's soccer players
Tampa Bay Rowdies draft picks
Tampa Bay Rowdies (1975–1993) players
Tulsa Roughnecks (1978–1984) players
1954 births
Association football defenders